Amata pactolina is a species of moth of the family Erebidae first described by Francis Walker in 1865. It is found in Australia.

References 

pactolina
Moths described in 1865
Moths of Australia